Furious may refer to:

Rage (emotion)

Arts and entertainment
Furious (album), by Soopa Villainz, 2005
"Furious", a song by Joan as Police Woman from the 2008 album To Survive
"Furious", a song by Ja Rule from The Fast and the Furious  (soundtrack), 2002
Furious (play), by Michael Gow, 1991
Furious (2017 film), or Legend of Kolovrat, a Russian historical fantasy action film
Fast & Furious, or The Fast and the Furious, an American crime action adventure films media franchise

Other uses
, the name of several Royal Navy ships

See also

 Fury (disambiguation)
 Furiosa (disambiguation)
 Furioso (disambiguation)
 Furio (disambiguation)